Prey Veng ("Long Forest") is a province (khaet) of Cambodia. The capital is Prey Veng. With a population of 1.1 million people, it is the third most populous province.

This densely populated agricultural region is located on the east bank of the Mekong. The name literally means "long forest" in khmer, but the last great forests have gradually disappeared there over 30-year to provide for agricultural land.

History

In early Christian era, the province was a major center of the kingdom of Funan, between economic and political capitals of the country what were Oc Eo (now in the Vietnamese province of An Giang) and Angkor Borei (in the Cambodian province of Takéo province).

However, with the advent of Chen-la, the hub of the kingdom moved farther west, to Koh Ker and Angkor and the region lost its importance.

In the 15th century, the Khmer emperors, under threat from the Siamese (former name of people of current Thailand) decided to resettle back to the east, to Oudong, Lovek then Phnom Penh. Prey Veng did not favor them as it was too close to another danger, namely the Annam. Nevertheless, they formed an army at Ba Phnom in 1473 to defend against an invasion of Siam.

Under the French protectorate, the colonial authorities saw potential of the region in terms of agriculture and fishing and its proximity to the French colony of Cochin China. Mass deforestation took place, to create land for agriculture.

In 1975 when the Khmer Rouge took power, the province experienced its first famine, until 1977. Thousands of people in Prey Veng province were killed by the Khmer Rouge and buried in mass graves.

As the Vietnamese army advanced in January 1979, the region regained its position and became one of the first areas of Cambodia liberated from the Khmer Rouge.

Geography
The province is bordered by those of Kampong Cham to the northwest, Tbong Khmum to the northeast, Kandal to the west, and Svay Rieng to the east and by Vietnam (Đồng Tháp, Long An and Tây Ninh) to the south. It is crossed by two major rivers of the country, namely the Mekong and Tonle Bassac.

The total land area of the province is 4,883 km2, which equals 2.7% of the total land area of Cambodia (181,035 km2). This consists of 445.18 km2 or 9.12% of human settlements, 3,100 km2 or 63.49% of agricultural land use, 194.61 km2 or 3.99% of forested area, 1,082.86 km2 or 22.18% of public land, infrastructure and water bodies. The remaining 60.35 km2 or 1.24% are unused areas.

Population
The total population is 947,357 persons or 7.07% of the total population of 13,388,910 persons in Cambodia  In the above number are also consisting of 825,818 person or 80.54% are farmers, 140,685 person or 13.72% are fishermen, 44,561 person or 4,35% are traders, 14,267 person or 1.39% are government's officers. The average density 194.0 person per km2.

The majority of the population is of Khmer origin and only 1.13% are from ethnic minorities such as Kinh (Viet), the Muslim Chams or Laos.

Economy

The province boasts of silt deposited in each flood, this makes the region conducive to agriculture and fishing. It is part of what is called the "great green belt" of Cambodia.

The main crop of rice and has the largest area devoted to rice in the country, contributing about 10% in the national crop and is among those that emerge each year the largest surplus. Tobacco, mung beans, cane sugar, palm sugar, cassava, sesame and fruits such as coconuts, mangoes and cashews are grown in Prey Veng. Rubber trees have played an important economic role in the past, but the plantations were abandoned during the wars that bloodied the country decades ago.

Districts

The province contains 1139 villages organized by 116 communes and 12 districts and 1 municipality. The districts are:

Tourist Sites

Ba Phnom
Ba Phnom is located 78 kilometers east of Phnom Penh and 45 kilometres south of the provincial capital. Its name literally means "ancestor of the hill". There is actually a mound of 139 meters.

Archaeological research has shown that it was an important cultural center of the kingdom of Fu-Nan, and a sacred place in which they worshipped Shiva. The site seems to have retained its sacred character throughout the Angkor period, and traces of animist and Buddhist rituals have also been found.

Prey Veng
The provincial capital is located on the National Road 11 between Neak Leung and Kampong Cham. It is located about 2 and half hours by road from Phnom Penh and 3 hours from Ho Chi Minh City. This quaint town is off the usual tourist trail and is uncrowded. It houses several old dilapidated colonial homes. There is a large lake west of the city which is dry from March to August.

References

External links
 Prey Veng at Royal Government of Cambodia website

Sources
Cambodian Ministry of Agriculture, Forestry and Fisheries

 
Provinces of Cambodia